Livermore is a train station in downtown Livermore, California.

Transit Service
The station is served by commuter Altamont Corridor Express (ACE) trains between San Jose's Diridon Station and Stockton's Cabral Station.  The majority of passengers at this station are commuters headed to job centers in the Silicon Valley. WHEELS routes 10R, 11, 14, 15, 20X, 580X and 30R stop at the adjacent Livermore Transit Center.

This station was originally planned as the site of a co-located BART station when the Livermore Extension was built from the terminus at Dublin/Pleasanton to Vasco Road. However, in July 2011, the Livermore City Council reversed its position in response to a petition requesting that the alignment stay within or nearby the Interstate 580 right-of-way, and now favors stations be built at the Interstate 580 interchanges with Isabel Avenue and Portola Avenue.

Platforms and tracks

Bus service
There are six daily Amtrak Thruway trips on line 6 to San Jose and a once daily to San Francisco on line 34.

References

External links 
 
 ACE Livermore Station

Altamont Corridor Express stations in Alameda County, California
Livermore, California
Railway stations in the United States opened in 1998
Amtrak Thruway Motorcoach stations in California
Former Western Pacific Railroad stations